Grady County is the name of two counties in the United States:

Grady County, Georgia
Grady County, Oklahoma